Rosedale Priory was a priory in Rosedale Abbey, North Yorkshire, England that was founded  1150–1199. By the time the priory was suppressed in 1535, it had one prioress and eight nuns. The religious house in Rosedale was a priory and not an abbey, despite the village being given the name Rosedale Abbey, and it is unclear why this came about.

The priory was founded during the reign of Henry II and finished during the reign of Richard the Lionheart. The land was donated by Robert de Stuteville, so that nuns from the Benedictine order could worship and farm the surrounding land.

After suppression during the reign of King Henry VIII, the priory was abandoned, though it is thought that most of the stones were re-used in the construction of the village buildings including the adjacent church of St Mary and St Lawrence. The turret was grade II listed in 1953.

References 

Monasteries in North Yorkshire